The 1931–32 season was the 23rd in the history of the Isthmian League, an English football competition.

Wimbledon were champions for the second season in a row.

League table

References

Isthmian League seasons
I